Terry Winsor is a British film director who has worked with such stars as Richard Harris, Sean Bean and Tom Wilkinson. He has directed a number of films, TV programs and even a game, which has led to a reasonable amount of success within the world of film.  For a full list see below.

Filmography
Party Party (1983)
Lubo's World (1984)
Morgan Stewart's Coming Home (1987)
Fool's Gold: The Story of the Brink's Mat Robbery (1992)
The Magician (1993) 
The Great Kandinsky (1995)
Thief Takers (1996) (TV)
Essex Boys (2000) 
Hot Money (2001) (TV)
Rock Face (2002) (TV)

Games
ToCA Race Driver 3 (2006)

References
 

Living people
British film directors
People from Swanage
Year of birth missing (living people)